The Greatest may refer to:

Film and television
 The Greatest (1977 film), a 1977 film about Muhammad Ali
 The Greatest (2009 film), a 2009 film featuring Pierce Brosnan and Susan Sarandon
 The Greatest (TV series), a VH1 series of countdowns
 The Greatest #AtHome Videos, a CBS video clip show

Literature
 The Greatest: My Own Story, a 1975 autobiography by Muhammad Ali

Music
 The Greatest!! Count Basie Plays, Joe Williams Sings Standards, 1956
 The Greatest (Ian Brown album), 2005
 The Greatest (Phunk Junkeez album), 2010
 The Greatest (Cat Power album), 2006
 The Greatest (Diana Ross album), 2011
 "The Greatest" (Lana Del Rey song), 2019
 "The Greatest" (Kenny Rogers song), 1999
 "The Greatest" (Sia song), 2016
 "The Greatest" (Six60 song), 2019
 "The Greatest" (Rod Wave song), 2020
 "The Greatest" (Michelle Williams song), 2008
 "The Greatest", 2016 song by Reks from his album The Greatest X

People
 Muhammad Ali (1942–2016), American heavyweight boxing champion.

See also
 Greatest (disambiguation)